The 759th Military Police Battalion is a military police battalion in the United States Army. It is currently stationed at Fort Carson, CO – "The Mountain Post". It is administratively controlled by the 4th Infantry Division Sustainment Brigade at Fort Carson, and is a part of the 89th Military Police Brigade at Fort Hood, Texas.

Organisation

Constituted 19 August 1942 in the Army of the United States as the 759th Military Police Battalion

Activated 15 September 1942 at Fort Ontario, New York

Reorganized and redesignated 17 September 1947 as the 759th Military Police Service Battalion

Reorganized and redesignated 20 November 1950 as the 759th Military Police Battalion

Allotted 26 November 1952 to the Regular Army

Inactivated 1 November 1953 in Germany

Activated 6 June 1968 at Fort Dix, New Jersey

(Organic elements inactivated 1 November 1970 at Fort Dix, New Jersey)

Subordinate units
148th Military Police Detachment
59th Military Police Company
110th Military Police Company
127th Military Police Company
984th Military Police Company

Campaign participation

World War II
Naples-Foggia 
Rome-Arno 
Southern France (with arrowhead) 
Rhineland 
Ardennes-Alsace 
Central Europe
Germany

Cold War
Berlin Airlift

Southwest Asia
Defense of Saudi Arabia 
Liberation and Defense of Kuwait 
Southwest Asia Cease-Fire 
Operation Noble Eagle 
OIF 2
Siege of Sadr City
Operation Phantom Fury
First Battle of Fallujah
OIF 06-08 
Afghanistan OEF X

Unit decorations

References

 US Army Center for History

External links
Globalsecurity.org, 759th Military Police Battalion

759